The Church of St. Mary the Virgin is a Grade I listed church in Felmersham, Bedfordshire, England.

Its foundations were laid in about 1220, and it was completed about 20 years later; some modifications were made in the 14th and 15th Centuries, but it remains largely in the style of its original form. The church is known for its West Front, having finely carved arcades and a heavily moulded doorway, and is of unusual scale and decoration for its type.

It became a listed building on 13 July 1964.

See also
Grade I listed buildings in Bedfordshire

References

External links

Church of England church buildings in Bedfordshire
Grade I listed churches in Bedfordshire
Mary